Thomas Hunt (2 September 1819 – 11 September 1858) was an English first-class cricketer.

Hunt was born at Chesterfield in September 1819. He made his debut in first-class cricket for Yorkshire against Manchester at Manchester in 1845. Hunt played first-class cricket on 39 occasions from 1845–58. In addition to playing for Yorkshire, Hunt also appeared for an All England Eleven, England, Lancashire, Manchester, the North, the Players, Sheffield and a United All-England Eleven. In his 39 matches he scored 922 runs at an average of 15.11, with a high score of 102. This score, which was the only time he passed fifty in first-class cricket, came for the North in the North v South fixture of 1856 at Broughton. As a right-arm roundarm fast bowler, he took 67 wickets at a bowling average of 14.94, taking five wickets in an innings on five occasions and ten wickets in a match once. Playing as a wicket-keeper, Hunt made nine stumpings. He died at Rochdale in September 1858.

References

External links

1819 births
1858 deaths
Cricketers from Chesterfield, Derbyshire
English cricketers
Yorkshire cricketers
Manchester Cricket Club cricketers
North v South cricketers
Non-international England cricketers
Sheffield Cricket Club cricketers
Lancashire cricketers
All-England Eleven cricketers
Players cricketers
United All-England Eleven cricketers